Vanadium(II) oxide is the inorganic compound with the idealized formula VO. It is one of the several binary vanadium oxides. It adopts a distorted NaCl structure and contains weak V−V metal to metal bonds. VO is a semiconductor owing to delocalisation of electrons in the t2g orbitals. VO is a non-stoichiometric compound, its composition varying from VO0.8 to VO1.3.

Diatomic VO is one of the molecules found in the spectrum of relatively cool M-type stars. A potential use of vanadium(II) monoxide is as a molecular vapor in synthetic chemical reagents in low-temperature matrices.

References

Vanadium(II) compounds
Non-stoichiometric compounds
Transition metal oxides
Rock salt crystal structure